Donghaixian railway station (literally "Donghai County railway station") is a station on Longhai railway in Donghai County, Lianyungang, Jiangsu.

History
The station was established in 1925 as Niushan railway station. It was changed to the current name in 1957.

On 10 September 2020, passenger services were suspended to allow for construction of the Lianyungang–Xuzhou high-speed railway.

References

Railway stations in Jiangsu
Stations on the Longhai Railway
Railway stations in China opened in 1925